Mediator of RNA polymerase II transcription subunit 24 is an enzyme that in humans is encoded by the MED24 gene.

Function 

This gene encodes a component of the mediator complex (also known as TRAP, SMCC, DRIP, or ARC), a transcriptional coactivator complex thought to be required for the expression of almost all genes. The mediator complex is recruited by transcriptional activators or nuclear receptors to induce gene expression, possibly by interacting with RNA polymerase II and promoting the formation of a transcriptional pre-initiation complex. Multiple transcript variants encoding different isoforms have been found for this gene.

Interactions 

MED24 has been shown to interact with Estrogen receptor alpha, Cyclin-dependent kinase 8, Calcitriol receptor and BRCA1.

References

Further reading